Featuring Freshness is the tenth compilation album by American hip hop group Insane Clown Posse. It was released on November 1, 2011. The album compiles many of the group's collaborations with other rappers. Though the majority of the material on this set is previously released, three new tracks appear on the album, featuring appearances from Afroman, Big Hutch and Paris. Previously released material includes collaborations with the Psychopathic Records and Hatchet House lineup, Ice-T, Snoop Dogg, Kid Rock and Tech N9ne. It is the group's 28th overall release.

Content 

The first disc exclusively focuses on guest appearances and collaborations with Psychopathic Records and Hatchet House artists. The second disc focuses on guest appearances and collaborations with artists from other labels, including Three 6 Mafia, Ice-T, Ol' Dirty Bastard, Snoop Dogg, Tech N9ne, Bushwick Bill and MC Breed. Three new tracks appear, featuring Afroman, Big Hutch and Paris. Much of the material on the album has previously been released on other albums, with the exception of three new songs. Kottonmouth Kings was previously announced to appear on the set, but no collaborations with this group appear.

Reviews 

AllMusic's David Jeffries wrote, "punky hip-hop kids and punky hip-hop kids at heart will appreciate having all these tracks in one place."

Track listing

References 

2011 albums
Insane Clown Posse compilation albums